An expansion team is a new team in a sports league, usually from a city that has not hosted a team in that league before, formed with the intention of satisfying the demand for a local team from a population in a new area. Sporting leagues also hope that the expansion of their competition will grow the popularity of the sport generally. The term is most commonly used in reference to the North American major professional sports leagues but is applied to sports leagues in other countries with a closed franchise system of league membership. The term refers to the expansion of the sport into new areas. The addition of an expansion team sometimes results in the payment of an expansion fee to the league by the new team and an expansion draft to populate the new roster.

Reasons for expansion
In North America, expansion often takes place in response to population growth and geographic shifts of population. Such demographic change results in financial opportunities to engage with the new market as consumers of sports demand local teams to support. Major League Baseball (MLB) was limited to 16 teams located north and east of St. Louis, Missouri for the first half of the 20th century. During that time, the United States population doubled and expanded to the south and west. Rival interests explored the possibility of forming a rival league in the untapped markets. To forestall that possibility, one of the measures that MLB took was to expand by four teams in 1961 and 1962. Over the past four decades, MLB expanded further, to its current 30-team membership. In the context of MLB, the term "expansion team" is also used to refer to any of the 14 teams enfranchised in the second half of the 20th century.

Leagues that are new and/or financially struggling may also admit large numbers of expansion teams so that the existing franchises can pocket more revenue from expansion fees. Indoor American football leagues are notorious for doing so: the leagues can double the number of teams and have many new teams fail within a year or two. Major League Soccer, after spending most of its first decade of existence with relatively stable membership and struggling finances, adopted a policy of continuous expansion beginning in 2005, a policy that the league as of 2017 has no intention of stopping.

When an expansion team begins play, it is generally stocked with less talented free agents, inexperienced players, and veterans nearing retirement. Additionally, prospective owners may face expensive fees to the league as well as high startup costs such as stadiums and facilities. The team is also at a disadvantage in that it has not been together as a team as long as its opponents and thus lacks the cohesiveness other teams have built over years. As a result, most expansion teams are known for their poor play during their first seasons. Expansion teams must also compete with any expansion rivals for available talent, a common problem since leagues often expand by two or four teams in one season. 

Expansion teams are not necessarily doomed to mediocrity, however, as most leagues have policies which promote parity, such as drafts and salary caps, which give some expansion teams the opportunity to win championships only a few years after their first season. In Major League Baseball (MLB) The Arizona Diamondbacks won the 2001 World Series in their fourth season, and the Florida Marlins won the 1997 World Series in their fifth season. In the NBA, The Milwaukee Bucks won the 1971 NBA Finals in their third year of existence, greatly helped by drafting Kareem Abdul-Jabbar in the 1969 draft and acquiring Oscar Robertson from the Cincinnati Royals before the 1970–71 season began. In the NHL, the Florida Panthers made the Stanley Cup Finals in their third season even though, like MLB, the league then had no salary cap; a cap was established in 2005. However, the Vegas Golden Knights quickly emerged as one of the NHL's best teams in its first season. Thanks to a generous expansion draft, the team defied all odds and advanced to the 2018 Stanley Cup Final.

The National Football League (NFL), despite being considered the most generous in its revenue sharing and the strictest with its salary cap, has had far more difficulty bringing expansion teams up to par with their more established brethren. Of the six teams to have been added to the NFL since the AFL–NFL merger, the fastest turnaround between an inaugural season and the team's first Super Bowl victory was 27 seasons (the Tampa Bay Buccaneers, established in 1976, won Super Bowl XXXVII in the 2002 season); none of the four teams to hold expansion drafts since 1995 have ever won that contest, with only one, the Carolina Panthers (who reached the game in their 9th and 21st seasons of existence) playing in the game. In , the Panthers and Jacksonville Jaguars each made it to their respective conference championship games in their second season in the league. 

Expansion teams are usually considered as such in their first season and sometimes in their second season. A team that moves to another location and/or changes its name is not an expansion team. If it moves, it is known as a relocated team, and if the name changes, the team is known as a renamed team. In response to a negative attitude that some fans have towards relocated teams, there have recently been instances where relocating clubs change their identity completely; name, colors, and mascot; but because the roster is the same and the league does not expand as a result, they are not regarded as expansion teams. One exception is the Baltimore Ravens of the National Football League (NFL): when the Cleveland Browns moved to Baltimore, an agreement was reached for which the trademark and history of the pre-1996 Cleveland Browns remained in that city and was claimed by the post-1999 Browns when the league placed a new franchise there, even though the personnel and roster had moved to Baltimore to become the Ravens. Another exception is the New Orleans Pelicans, who were previously known as the New Orleans Hornets after relocating to New Orleans from Charlotte, N.C., in 2002. After the 2012 sale of the Hornets, new owner Tom Benson changed the name, colors, and mascot from Hornets to Pelicans. The Charlotte Hornets segment of the franchise's history was sold to the then-Charlotte Bobcats (themselves formerly considered a 2004 expansion team) and the 2002 New Orleans Hornets are now officially regarded as an expansion team.

Cities and regions with large populations that lack a team are generally regarded to be the best candidates for new teams. In rugby league, the United Kingdom-based Rugby Football League's Super League has added teams from France and Wales to cover a great demographic spread. The operator of Super League, England's Rugby Football League, has also added teams to the lower levels of its league pyramid, specifically the Championship and League 1, from both France and Wales, and most recently Canada. In rugby union, the competition originally known as the Celtic League and now as Pro14, which began with sides only from the Celtic nations of Ireland, Scotland, and Wales, has added teams from Italy and more recently South Africa. The U.S.-based NFL has been laying groundwork for a potential franchise in the UK, with a target date some time in the early to mid-2020s.

Expansion teams in North America

Major League Baseball (MLB)
The National League had an eight-team lineup established in 1900, mirrored by the eight charter franchises of the American League in 1901. This list enumerates franchises added since this "Classic Eight" era.
1961: Los Angeles Angels; Washington Senators (now Texas Rangers) 
1962: Houston Colt .45s (now Houston Astros); New York Mets
1969: Kansas City Royals; Montreal Expos (now Washington Nationals); San Diego Padres; Seattle Pilots (now Milwaukee Brewers)
1977: Seattle Mariners; Toronto Blue Jays
1993: Colorado Rockies; Florida Marlins (now Miami Marlins)
1998: Arizona Diamondbacks; Tampa Bay Devil Rays (now Tampa Bay Rays)

National Basketball Association (NBA)

Eight charter franchises of the NBA (founded in 1950 via merger of the BAA and NBL) are still active.
1961: Chicago Packers (later Chicago Zephyrs, then Baltimore Bullets, then Capital Bullets, then Washington Bullets, now Washington Wizards)
1966: Chicago Bulls
1967: San Diego Rockets (now Houston Rockets); Seattle SuperSonics (now Oklahoma City Thunder)
1968: Milwaukee Bucks; Phoenix Suns
1970: Cleveland Cavaliers; Buffalo Braves (later San Diego Clippers, now Los Angeles Clippers); Portland Trail Blazers
1974: New Orleans Jazz (now Utah Jazz)
1976: New York Nets (later New Jersey Nets, now Brooklyn Nets), Denver Nuggets, Indiana Pacers, and San Antonio Spurs join NBA after merger with American Basketball Association (ABA).
1980: Dallas Mavericks 
1988: Miami Heat; Charlotte Hornets 
1989: Minnesota Timberwolves; Orlando Magic
1995: Vancouver Grizzlies (now Memphis Grizzlies); Toronto Raptors
2002: New Orleans Hornets (now New Orleans Pelicans) – The Charlotte Hornets relocated to New Orleans in 2002 and in 2013 renamed themselves the New Orleans Pelicans. Subsequently, the original Charlotte Hornets' history was assumed by the revived Charlotte Hornets (previously Charlotte Bobcats; see below). Hence, the Pelicans are retrospectively considered to be an expansion team that began play in the 2002–03 season, while the Charlotte Hornets are considered to have suspended operations from 2002 until 2004.
2004: Charlotte Bobcats enter the league and hold an expansion draft. In 2014 the team was renamed the Charlotte Hornets (see above) and received possession of the history and records of the Charlotte Hornets prior to 2002. Hence, the Bobcats are retrospectively considered to be a revival of the previous Charlotte franchise, rather than an expansion team.

American Basketball Association (ABA)
There’s only one expansion team in the whole history of the ABA.
1972: San Diego Conquistadors

National Football League (NFL)
Only extant teams are listed. Two charter franchises, the Chicago Cardinals (now Arizona Cardinals) and  Decatur Staleys (now the Chicago Bears), are still active.

1921: Green Bay Packers, previously an independent, join the league.
1925: New York Giants (replaced another team of the same name that left the league after one season in 1921)
1930: Portsmouth Spartans (now Detroit Lions), previously of the Ohio League, join the NFL.
1932: Boston Braves (now Washington Commanders) – replaced the 1931 Cleveland Indians, who in turn replaced the Orange/Newark Tornadoes, a 1929 expansion team that left the league in 1931.
1933: Philadelphia Eagles — replaced the Frankford Yellow Jackets, a 1924 expansion team that folded in 1931; Pittsburgh Pirates (now Pittsburgh Steelers), previously the Rooneys of the Western Pennsylvania Senior Independent Football Conference, join the league.
1937: Cleveland Rams (now Los Angeles Rams) join, having previously played in the 1936 American Football League.
1950: Three teams joined the NFL after a partial merger with the rival All-America Football Conference (AAFC), two of which survive: Cleveland Browns and San Francisco 49ers
1953: Baltimore Colts (second) (now Indianapolis Colts); not to be confused with the AAFC Baltimore Colts, who were the third AAFC team to join the NFL but folded in 1950. They replaced the position held by several franchises, dating back to another charter franchise, the Dayton Triangles.
1960: Dallas Cowboys
1961: Minnesota Vikings
1966: Atlanta Falcons
1967: New Orleans Saints
1970: Boston Patriots (now New England Patriots), Buffalo Bills, Cincinnati Bengals, Denver Broncos, Houston Oilers (now Tennessee Titans), Kansas City Chiefs, Miami Dolphins, New York Jets, Oakland Raiders (now Las Vegas Raiders), and San Diego Chargers (now Los Angeles Chargers) join NFL after merger with the 1960 American Football League (AFL). 
1976: Seattle Seahawks; Tampa Bay Buccaneers
1995: Carolina Panthers; Jacksonville Jaguars
1996: Baltimore Ravens — The Cleveland Browns effectively relocate to Baltimore and become the Ravens, though the legacy of the Browns stays in Cleveland for a future revival of the franchise (see below). Hence the Baltimore Ravens are officially considered an expansion team that began play in the 1996 season.
1999: The Cleveland Browns are revived, hold an expansion draft, and receive sole possession of the history and records of the Browns prior to 1996. The Browns are retrospectively considered to be a revival of the previous Cleveland Browns franchise, rather than an expansion team.
2002: Houston Texans

American Football League
Two teams from the AFL of the 1960s were expansion teams in that league. Both joined the AFL after the merger with the NFL was agreed to, but before it was finalized.
 1966: Miami Dolphins
 1968: Cincinnati Bengals

National Hockey League (NHL)

The NHL had a six-team lineup established in 1942. This list enumerates the teams added since the "Original Six" era.

1967: Los Angeles Kings; Minnesota North Stars (now Dallas Stars); California Seals (defunct; later Cleveland Barons; merged with Minnesota North Stars in 1978); Philadelphia Flyers; Pittsburgh Penguins; St. Louis Blues
1970: Buffalo Sabres; Vancouver Canucks
1972: Atlanta Flames (now Calgary Flames); New York Islanders
1974: Kansas City Scouts (later Colorado Rockies, now New Jersey Devils); Washington Capitals
1979: Hartford Whalers (now Carolina Hurricanes), Quebec Nordiques (now Colorado Avalanche), Edmonton Oilers, and original Winnipeg Jets (now Arizona Coyotes) — all join NHL after merger with World Hockey Association (WHA).
1991: San Jose Sharks
1992: Ottawa Senators; Tampa Bay Lightning
1993: Mighty Ducks of Anaheim (now Anaheim Ducks); Florida Panthers
1998: Nashville Predators
1999: Atlanta Thrashers (now current Winnipeg Jets)
2000: Columbus Blue Jackets; Minnesota Wild
2017: Vegas Golden Knights
2021: Seattle Kraken

Major League Soccer (MLS)

1998: Chicago Fire FC (originally Chicago Fire SC); Miami Fusion (contracted in 2002)
2005: Chivas USA (folded by the league in 2014); Real Salt Lake
2006: Houston Dynamo – In 2005, the San Jose Earthquakes relocated to Houston, considered to be a new expansion team, while the Earthquakes were put on hiatus.
2007: Toronto FC; revived San Jose Earthquakes
2009: Seattle Sounders FC
2010: Philadelphia Union
2011: Portland Timbers; Vancouver Whitecaps FC
2012: Montreal Impact (now CF Montréal)
2015: New York City FC; Orlando City SC
2017: Atlanta United FC; Minnesota United FC
2018: Los Angeles FC
2019: FC Cincinnati
2020: Inter Miami CF; Nashville SC
2021: Austin FC
2022: Charlotte FC
2023: St. Louis City SC

Canadian Football League (CFL)

1993: Sacramento Gold Miners (defunct) – The first entry in the league's failed attempt to expand into the U.S. After the 1994 season, the team relocated to San Antonio and played as the San Antonio Texans before folding after the 1995 season.
1994:
Baltimore Stallions (technically defunct) – The Stallions were the most successful team in the CFL's U.S. experiment, winning the Grey Cup in 1995. However, the impending relocation of the NFL's Cleveland Browns to Baltimore led the team to depart for Montreal, where it became the current version of the Montreal Alouettes. Despite this history, the CFL does not recognize the link between the Stallions and Alouettes, instead treating the Alouettes as a continuation of past CFL teams in Montreal.
Las Vegas Posse (defunct) – Also part of the CFL's failed U.S. experiment
Shreveport Pirates (defunct) – Also part of the CFL's failed U.S. experiment
1995: Birmingham Barracudas (defunct); Memphis Mad Dogs (defunct)
2002: Ottawa Renegades (defunct, though now treated by the CFL as the same team as the past Ottawa Rough Riders and current Ottawa Redblacks)
2014: Ottawa Redblacks

National Lacrosse League (NLL) 
1989: Detroit Turbos (defunct); New England Blazers (defunct; previously Boston Blazers)
1990: Pittsburgh Bulls (defunct)
1992: Buffalo Bandits
1995: Rochester Knighthawks
1996: Charlotte Cobras (defunct)
1998: Ontario Raiders (now Toronto Rock); Syracuse Smash (defunct; previously Ottawa Rebel)
2000: Albany Attack (now Vancouver Warriors; previously Vancouver Stealth, San Jose Stealth, and Washington Stealth)
2001: Columbus Landsharks (defunct; previously Arizona Sting)
2002: Calgary Roughnecks; Montreal Express (defunct); New Jersey Storm (defunct; previously Anaheim Storm); Vancouver Ravens (defunct)
2005: Minnesota Swarm (now Georgia Swarm)
2006: Edmonton Rush (now Saskatchewan Rush); Portland Lumberjax (defunct)
2007: Chicago Shamrox (defunct); New York Titans (defunct; previously Orlando Titans)
2009: Boston Blazers (second iteration; defunct)
2019: San Diego Seals, Philadelphia Wings
2020: Halifax Thunderbirds, New York Riptide
2021: Panther City Lacrosse Club
2022: Las Vegas Desert Dogs

Major League Lacrosse (MLL)

2006: Chicago Machine (later the second iteration of the Rochester Rattlers and Dallas Rattlers) (defunct); Denver Outlaws; Los Angeles Riptide (defunct); San Francisco Dragons (defunct)
2009: Toronto Nationals (later Hamilton Nationals; though the league considers it an expansion, it was a relocation of the management and player assets from the original Rochester Rattlers, though the name, colors and team history remained in Rochester) (defunct)
2012: Ohio Machine (defunct); Charlotte Hounds (hiatus)
2014: Florida Launch (Though the league considers it an expansion, it was a relocation of the management and player assets from the Hamilton Nationals, though the name, colors, and team history remained in Hamilton) (defunct)
2016: Atlanta Blaze (defunct)
2020: Connecticut Hammerheads

Major League Rugby (MLR) 
Six of the seven charter franchises from 2018 remain active.

 2019: Rugby United New York; Toronto Arrows
 2020: New England Free Jacks; Old Glory DC; Rugby ATL
 2021: LA Giltinis (defunct)
 2022: Dallas Jackals
 2023: Chicago Hounds
 2024: Miami Sharks

Women's National Basketball Association (WNBA) 
1998: Detroit Shock (later the Tulsa Shock, now Dallas Wings); Washington Mystics
1999: Orlando Miracle (now the Connecticut Sun); Minnesota Lynx
2000: Indiana Fever; Seattle Storm; Miami Sol (folded); Portland Fire (folded)
2006: Chicago Sky
2008: Atlanta Dream

National Women's Soccer League (NWSL)

 2014: Houston Dash
 2016: Orlando Pride
 2018: Utah Royals FC – New franchise, but did not increase the number of teams in the league; replaced the folded FC Kansas City.
 2021: Racing Louisville FC; Kansas City Current (franchise moved from Utah Royals FC)
 2022: Angel City FC; San Diego Wave
 2024: San Jose/San Francisco Bay area NWSL Team; Revived of Utah Royals

Canadian Premier League (CPL)

 2020: Atlético Ottawa
 2023: Vancouver FC

Canadian Elite Basketball League (CEBL)

 2020: Ottawa BlackJacks
 2022: Montreal Alliance;  Scarborough Shooting Stars; Newfoundland Growlers
 2023: Winnipeg Sea Bears

Junior League expansion teams

Ontario Hockey League

1981: Belleville Bulls (Now the Hamilton Bulldogs)
1982: Guelph Platers (Later the Owen Sound Platers; now the Owen Sound Attack)
1990: Detroit Compuware Ambassadors (Later the Detroit Jr. Red Wings, Detroit Whalers, and Plymouth Whalers; now the Flint Firebirds)
1995: Barrie Colts
1996: Toronto St. Michael's Majors (Later the Mississauga St. Michael's Majors; now the Mississauga Steelheads)
1998: Brampton Battalion (Now the North Bay Battalion); Mississauga IceDogs (Now the Niagara IceDogs)

Quebec Major Junior Hockey League

2005: Saint John Sea Dogs; St. John's Fog Devils (became Montreal Junior Hockey Club in 2008 and Blainville-Boisbriand Armada in 2011)
2012: Sherbrooke Phoenix

Western Hockey League

1991: Tacoma Rockets (Now the Kelowna Rockets)
1992: Red Deer Rebels
1995: Calgary Hitmen
1996: Edmonton Ice (Moved to Cranbrook, British Columbia two years later and changed their name to the Kootenay Ice, now Winnipeg Ice)
2001: Vancouver Giants
2003: Everett Silvertips
2006: Chilliwack Bruins (Moved to Victoria, British Columbia in 2011 and became the Victoria Royals)
2007: Edmonton Oil Kings

Expansion teams in Australia and New Zealand

A-League Men

2007–08: Wellington Phoenix
2009–10: Gold Coast United (defunct); Northern Fury FC (defunct)
2010–11: Melbourne Heart (now Melbourne City since 2014–15 A-League season)
2012–13: Western Sydney Wanderers
2019–20: Western United
2020–21: Macarthur FC
2024–25: Auckland and Canberra A-League team

Australian Baseball League
2018: Auckland Tuatara; Geelong-Korea (both folded after 2020 season)

Australian Football League

1908: Richmond Tigers (relocated from the VFA), University (dropped out of competition and folded at the end of 1914)
1925: Hawthorn Hawks, North Melbourne Kangaroos and Footscray Bulldogs (became Western Bulldogs in 1996). All three teams relocated from the VFA.
1987: Brisbane Bears (now Brisbane Lions); West Coast Eagles
1991: Adelaide Crows 
1995: Fremantle Dockers
1997: Port Adelaide Power (had history/links from the successful Port Adelaide Magpies in the SANFL)
2011: Gold Coast Suns
2012: Greater Western Sydney Giants

AFL Women's
AFL Women's, launched in 2017 with 8 teams, is operated by the Australian Football League, with all teams fielded by AFL clubs. The league expanded to 10 teams prior to the 2019 season and 14 prior to the 2020 season. In 2023, the remaining four AFL clubs will launch women's sides. 
 2019: Geelong; North Melbourne
 2020: Gold Coast Suns; Richmond; St Kilda; West Coast Eagles
 2023: Essendon, Hawthorn, Port Adelaide, Sydney Swans

National Basketball League

1980: Coburg Giants (later became North Melbourne Giants in 1987–1998); Launceston Casino City (defunct)
1981: Forestville Eagles (now currently playing NBL1 Central)
1982: Adelaide City Eagles (now Adelaide 36ers); Geelong Cats (now Geelong Supercats until 1996 but now currently playing NBL1 South); Westate Wildcats (now Perth Wildcats)
1983: Devonport Warriors (defunct); Hobart Devils (defunct)
1984: Melbourne Tigers (now Melbourne United)
1988: Sydney Kings (merger of Sydney Supersonics and West Sydney Westars)
1990: Gold Coast Cougars (defunct, later known as Gold Coast Rollers)
1992: South East Melbourne Magic (defunct)
1993: Townsville Suns (now Townsville Crocodiles in 1998)
1998: Victoria Titans (later became Victoria Giants in 2002–2004 and then defunct); West Sydney Razorbacks (now Sydney Spirit, later defunct)
1999: Cairns Taipans
2004: Hunter Pirates (defunct); New Zealand Breakers
2006: Singapore Slingers (defunct); South Dragons (defunct)
2007: Gold Coast Blaze (defunct)
2019: South East Melbourne Phoenix
2021: Tasmania JackJumpers

National Rugby League

1910: Annandale
1920: University
1921: St. George Dragons
1935: Canterbury-Bankstown Bulldogs
1947: Manly-Warringah Sea Eagles; Parramatta Eels
1967: Cronulla-Sutherland Sharks; Penrith Panthers
1982: Canberra Raiders; Illawarra Steelers (now part of joint venture with St. George Dragons)
1988: Brisbane Broncos; Gold Coast-Tweed Giants (later Chargers, now defunct); Newcastle Knights
1995: Auckland Warriors (now New Zealand Warriors); North Queensland Cowboys; South Queensland Crushers (now defunct); Western Reds (now defunct)
1998: Melbourne Storm; Adelaide Rams (now defunct)
1999: St George Illawarra Dragons (Joint venture between St. George Dragons and Illawarra Steelers)
2000: Wests Tigers (Joint venture between Western Suburbs Magpies and Balmain Tigers)
2000: Northern Eagles (Joint venture between North Sydney Bears and Manly-Warringah Sea Eagles) (now defunct; reverted to Manly-Warringah Sea Eagles)
2007: Gold Coast Titans
2023: The Dolphins

New South Wales Cup

2007: Auckland Lions

Northern Territory Football League

2006: Tiwi Bombers Football Club

Queensland Cup

2008: Mackay Cutters; Northern Pride

Ron Massey Cup

2008: WA Reds

Super League

1997: Adelaide Rams (now defunct); Hunter Mariners (now defunct)

Super Rugby

2006: Cheetahs and Western Force
 The Cheetahs and Force were both dropped from Super Rugby after the 2017 season. The Cheetahs immediately became an expansion team in Pro14. The Force later moved to Australia's National Rugby Championship.
2011: Melbourne Rebels
2013: Southern Kings
 The Kings were dropped from Super Rugby at the same time as the Cheetahs and Force, and joined Pro14 alongside the Cheetahs. 
2016: Jaguares and Sunwolves
2022: Moana Pasifika and Fijian Drua

Victorian Football League

1998: Bendigo Bombers
2001: Tasmanian Devils

West Australian Football League

1997: Peel Thunder

Women's National Basketball League

1983: AIS (defunct)
1984: Bulleen Boomers (now Melbourne Boomers)
1986: Canberra Capitals
1989: Sydney Flames (now Sydney Uni Flames)
1990: Perth Lynx
1992: Adelaide Lightning; Dandenong Rangers
2001: Townsville Fire
2007: Bendigo Spirit
2008: Logan Thunder (defunct)
2015: South East Queensland Stars

Expansion teams in Asia

Indian Premier League

2011: Kochi Tuskers Kerala; Pune Warriors India
2016: Gujarat Lions; Rising Pune Supergiants
2022: Gujarat Titans; Lucknow Super Giants

Indian Super League

2017–2018: Bengaluru FC; Jamshedpur FC
2019–2020: Hyderabad FC
2020–2021: SC East Bengal
2023–2024: RoundGlass Punjab

Maharlika Pilipinas Basketball League
2018 (debut season): Bataan Defenders; Batangas City Athletics; Bulacan Kuyas; Caloocan Supremos; Imus Bandera; Muntinlupa Cagers; Navotas Clutch; Parañaque Patriots; Quezon City Capitals; Valenzuela Classic 
2018–2019: Bacoor Strikers; Basilan Steel; Cebu City Sharks; Davao Occidental Tigers; GenSan Warriors; Laguna Heroes; Makati Skyscrapers; Mandaluyong El Tigre; Manila Stars; Marikina Shoemasters; Pampanga Lanterns; Pasig Pirates; Pasay Voyagers; Rizal Golden Coolers; San Juan Knights; Zamboanga Family's Brand Sardines 
2019–2020: Sarangani Marlins; Iloilo United Royals; Bicol Volcanoes; Mindoro Tamaraws; Nueva Ecija Rice Vanguards; Bacolod Master Sardines (now Bacolod Maskaras)
2023: Negros Muscovados; Quezon Huskers

Philippine Basketball Association

1978: Filmanbank Bankers (defunct) 
1979: Gilbey's Gin (now Barangay Ginebra San Miguel) 
1980: CDCP/Galleon Shippers (defunct) 
1983: Manhattan Shirtmakers/Country Fair Hotdogs (defunct) 
1984: Manila Beer Brewmasters (folded after the 1986 season)
1985: Shell Azodrin Bugbusters (folded in 2005)
1986: Alaska Aces (folded in 2022)
1988: Purefoods Hotdogs
1990: Sarsi Sizzlers (folded after the 2001 season); Pepsi Hotshots (now TNT Tropang Giga) 
1993: Sta. Lucia Realtors (folded in 2010)
1999: Tanduay Rhum Masters (folded after the 2001 season)
2000: Batang Red Bull Energy Kings (from the PBL, note that the promotion and relegation system was not used.) (folded in 2011)
2002: FedEx Express (folded in 2016); Coca-Cola Tigers (folded in 2012)
2006: Welcoat Dragons (from the PBL, note that the promotion and relegation system was not used.) (now Rain or Shine Elasto Painters) 
2010: Meralco Bolts 
2011: Shopinas.com Clickers (folded in 2014)
2012: GlobalPort Batang Pier 
2014: Blackwater Elite; Kia Sorento (now Terrafirma Dyip); NLEX Road Warriors 
2016: Phoenix Fuel Masters 
2022: Converge FiberXers

Philippines Football League
2017 (debut season): Ceres-Negros F.C.; Davao Aguilas F.C.; Global F.C.; Ilocos United F.C.; Kaya F.C. (now Kaya F.C.-Iloilo); F.C. Meralco Manila; JPV Marikina F.C.; Stallion Laguna F.C.
2019: Green Archers United F.C.; Mendiola F.C. 1991; Philippine Air Force F.C.
2020: Maharlika Manila F.C.; Azkals Development Team 
2022-2023: Dynamic Herb Cebu F.C.

Pakistan Super League

2018: Multan Sultans

P. LEAGUE+
2021: New Taipei Kings; Kaohsiung Steelers

Expansion teams in Europe

Kontinental Hockey League

2009: Avtomobilist Yekaterinburg
2010: HC Yugra
2011: Lev Poprad – This team, based in Slovakia, was purchased after its first KHL season (2011–12) by Czech interests. It was disbanded and replaced by the similarly named Lev Praha. The latter team folded at the end of the 2013–14 season.
2012: HC Donbass; Slovan Bratislava
 Donbass left the KHL after the 2013–14 season. The team joined what is now known as the Ukrainian Hockey League in 2015–16.
2013: Admiral Vladivostok; KHL Medveščak (from Zagreb, Croatia)
 Medveščak, which had joined from the Austrian Hockey League, withdrew from the KHL after the 2016–17 season to rejoin the Austrian league.
2014: Sochi; Jokerit (from Helsinki, Finland)
2016: Kunlun Red Star (from Beijing, China)

United Rugby Championship
Originally known as the Celtic League, and later as Pro12 and Pro14.
2010:
Aironi – A team formed specifically for the competition by several existing clubs in Northern Italy, with Viadana the lead side. The team folded when the Italian Rugby Federation (FIR) revoked its professional license effective with the end of the 2011–12 Pro12 season; it was replaced by the FIR-operated Zebre.
Benetton Treviso – Founded in 1932, it competed in Italian domestic leagues before joining the competition originally known as the Celtic League, later known as Pro12 and now as Pro14.
2017:
Cheetahs
Southern Kings
 These teams had played in Super Rugby before that competition's governing body, SANZAAR, axed three teams at the end of the 2017 season. Both had themselves been Super Rugby expansion teams; the Cheetahs entered in 2006 and the Kings in 2013. The Kings were liquidated prior to the 2020–21 season when a planned takeover bid collapsed in fraud; the Cheetahs left after that season.
 2021:
 Bulls
 Lions
 Sharks
 Stormers
 South Africa's so-called "Big Four" Super Rugby sides left that competition after its reorganisation amid the COVID-19 pandemic. They joined the former Pro14, which changed its name to the United Rugby Championship.

Super League

1995: Paris Saint-Germain RL (now defunct)
2006: Catalans Dragons — Although Super League used a promotion and relegation system at that time, Les Catalans, as the only French team in the otherwise all-English competition, were assured of a place in the league through 2008. Super League instituted a franchise system effective with the 2009 season, and Les Catalans retained their place in the league.
2009:
Celtic Crusaders (later Crusaders Rugby League) – An expansion team only in the sense that they were invited into Super League. The club were established in 2005. After the 2011 season, the club folded due to financial problems; their effective successor club, the North Wales Crusaders, currently compete in League 1, two levels below Super League.
Salford City Reds – Also technically not an expansion team; they have existed since 1873 and played in Super League as recently as the 2007 season.
2012: Widnes Vikings – An expansion team only in the sense that they have been invited into the now-franchised Super League. The club have existed since 1875, were founding members of what is now the Rugby Football League in 1895, and participated in Super League as recently as 2005.

VTB United League

2010: Espoon Honka; Tsmoki-Minsk (formerly Minsk-2006)
2022: Samara; MBA Moscow

Expansion teams in Africa

Vodacom Cup

2010:
 Welwitschias (a developmental side for the Namibia national rugby union team) – This was the second time Namibia participated in the competition; it entered a team from 1999 to 2001. The team withdrew from the competition after the 2011 season due to financial constraints. They remained in the Vodacom Cup until the competition was scrapped after its 2015 season. The team now features in the Vodacom Cup's successor competition, the Rugby Challenge.
Pampas XV (a developmental side for the Argentina national rugby union team) – Argentina left the Vodacom Cup after the 2013 season, choosing instead to enter the IRB Pacific Cup from 2014. At that time, it was also expected that Argentina would be added to Super Rugby in the near future, and the country would eventually receive a Super Rugby team beginning in 2016.

eSports

League of Legends
The League of Legends Championship Series (LCS) and the League of Legends European Championship (LEC) initially fielded teams from eight organizations when they began operations in 2013; both leagues expanded to a total of ten teams in 2015.

LCS expansion teams
 Team Liquid (2015)
 Winterfox (2015; folded 2016)
 Gravity Gaming → Echo Fox (2015; folded 2019)
 Immortals (2016)
 Phoenix1 (2016; folded 2018)
 Flyquest (2017)
 100 Thieves (2018)
 Golden Guardians (2018)
 Evil Geniuses (2020)

LEC expansion teams
 Elements (2015; folded 2016)
 SK Gaming (2015)
 Schalke 04 (2016)
 Splyce → MAD Lions (2016)
 G2 Esports (2016)
 Team Vitality (2016)
 Excel Esports (2019)
 Rogue (2019)

Notes

References

Sports terminology